Lady Georgiana Fane (1801-1874) was an English heiress, daughter of John Fane, 10th Earl of Westmorland and his second wife the former Jane Huck-Saunders.  Her mother bore four other children before separating from her father, after ten years of marriage.

Georgiana is known for two things, a much commented upon portrait of her, when she was five or six years old, dressed as a peasant girl, and for her apparent stalking of the Duke of Wellington.

She met Wellington in 1815, shortly after his final victory over Napoleon Bonaparte, at the Battle of Waterloo, when she was fourteen years old, and he was 47.

Lord Palmerston, who was carrying on an affair with her married half-sister, Sarah Villiers, Countess of Jersey, proposed to Georgiana, twice, in 1823, but she turned him down.

The existence of suggestive letters, from Wellington, seems to confirm they did have a sexual relationship in the 1820s.  After his wife, the former Kitty Pakenham, died in 1830, Georgiana, and several other women intensified their interest in Wellington, hoping to become his second wife.  She could not accept his rejection of her, and harassed him for the rest of his life.

In 1846 she was sculpted by John Edward Carew.

References

1801 births
1874 deaths
19th-century British women
Daughters of British earls
]]Category:Fane family|Georgiana]]